Court House Crooks is a 1915 American short comedy film. It features Harold Lloyd in an uncredited role.

Cast
 Ford Sterling as The District Attorney
 Charles Arling as The Judge
 Minta Durfee as The Judge's Wife
 Doris Baker as Little Sister (uncredited)
 Billie Bennett as Mother (uncredited)
 Harold J. Binney as Large Juror (uncredited)
 Louise Carver as Older Woman (uncredited)
 Patrick Kelly as Man Next to Large Man (uncredited)
 Harold Lloyd as Young Man Out of Work (uncredited)

Preservation status
The film is preserved in the Library of Congress collection.

See also
 List of American films of 1915
 Harold Lloyd filmography

References

External links

 Court House Crooks on YouTube

1915 films
1915 comedy films
1915 short films
Silent American comedy films
American silent short films
American black-and-white films
Keystone Studios films
American comedy short films
1910s American films
1910s English-language films